Bhattadev University (Assamese: ভট্টদেৱ বিশ্ববিদ্যালয়,) offers Bachelor of Arts, Bachelor of Science, Bachelor of Commerce, Master of Arts and Master of Science courses. It was upgraded from Bajali College by Bhattadev University Act, 2017 which was passed by the Governor of Assam on 7 September 2017.

History 
Bhattadev University, Bajali, is the realization of a long cherished dream of the people of greater Bajali Sub-Division that came into being on 24 June 2019 after the first Vice-Chancellor of the University Prof. Birinchi Kr. Das assumed office. The university was upgraded from the erstwhile Bajali College which had a glorious history of more than six decades and was widely recognized as one of the prominent educational institutions of the state of Assam. The university was established by Bhattadev University Act, 2017 to which the Governor of Assam gave his assent on 16 October 2017. It is named after an illustrious son of Assam Baikunthanath Bhagavat Bhattacharya popularly known as Bhattadev, who is acknowledged as the father of Assamese prose. Bhattadev's erudition in Sanskrit grammar and literature, and his command over the Shrimadbhagavata purana earned him the title of Bhagavat Bhattacharya.

Bajali College was the fruition of the vision and dedication of many prominent individuals of Bajali and the toil and sacrifice of the local agrarian community who contributed from their earnings of selling rice paddy to the establishment of the college. Bajali College grew under the dynamic leadership of Kameswar Das, who stood first class first in his MSc final examination from Calcutta University. Bajali College from its humble origin in the year 1955 strived towards academic excellence and it came to be known as one of the best colleges for science education in Assam. It is imperative to mention here that Bajali College started postgraduate courses in the Geography and Zoology departments way back in the 1980s with the postgraduate Department of Geography being the second oldest in Assam after Gauhati University.

Bajali College endeavoured in its pursuit of academic excellence and indeed it was accredited with “A” Grade in its second cycle by NAAC in the year 2016.

Though in its nascent stage, the university has introduced the postgraduate programme in Physics in the very first year of its inception. It can be mentioned here that Bajali College already had postgraduate programmes in Mathematics, Assamese, Zoology, Geography before its upgradation to Bhattadev University. The university, under the dynamic leadership of Prof. Birinchi Kr. Das, is striving hard and has already taken steps in various fields of activities to establish it as one of the reputed Universities of India in the line of Gauhati University, Tezpur University and IIT Guwahati.

Academics 
Science
 HSSLC (Higher Secondary School Leaving Certificate) or (10+2)
 Bachelor of Science
 B.Sc. in Physics
 B.Sc. in Chemistry
 B.Sc. in Mathematics
 B.Sc. in Zoology
 B.Sc. in Botany
 B.Sc. in Statistics
 B.Sc. in Economics with Computer Applications

 Master of Science
 M.Sc. in Zoology (i) Cell and Molecular Biology (ii) Fish and Fishery Biology (iii) Entomology
Commerce
 HSSLC (Higher Secondary School Leaving Certificate) or (10+2)
  Bachelor of Commerce
  B.Com. Regular
  B.Com. in Accounting
  B.Com. in Finance
  B.Com. in Management

Humanities
 HSSLC (Higher Secondary School Leaving Certificate) or (10+2)
Bachelor of Arts
 B.A. in Assamese
 B.A. in English
 B.A. in Sanskrit
 B.A. in Education
 B.A. in Philosophy
 B.A. in Economics
 B.A. in Geography
 B.A. in History
 B.A. in Political Science
 B.A. in Elective Assamese
 B.A. in History & Mathematics
 B.A. in Economics & Sanskrit
 B.A. in Philosophy, Elective Assamese and Geography
 B.A. in Tourism & Travel Management, Economics & Sanskrit
 B.A. in Political Science, Statistics, Education & Tourism Management

 Master of Arts
 M.A. in Geography (i) Geography of Rural Development (ii) Fluvial Geo morphology
 M.A. in Assamese (i) Literature (Group-A) (ii) Language (Group-B)

Engineering/Technologies

 IGNOU Study Centre
A study cum examination centre (Code No. 0411) of Indira Gandhi National Open University (IGNOU) was set up in the college premises in 1999 with Pabitra Mohan Kalita, former HOD, Physics, as its founder co-ordinator. The centre offers the following programmes with Dr Rupam Patgiri, HOD, Chemistry as its present co-ordinator.
 Programmes offered
 Certificate programme (6 months duration)
CTS – Certificate in Tourism Studies
CFN – Certificate in Food and Nutrition
CES – Certificate in Environmental Studies
CPLT – Certificate in Programme Lab Technique.
CTPM – Certificate in Teaching of Primary School Mathematics
CTE – Certificate in Teaching of English
BPP- Bachelor's Preparatory Programme.
CHR- Certificate in Human Rights.
 Diploma Programmes (1 year duration)
DTS – Diploma in Tourism Studies
ADTS – Advanced Diploma in Tourism Studies.
DNHE- Diploma in Nutrition and  Healh Education.
DCE- Diploma in Child Education.
DWED- Diploma in Women Empowerment and Development.
DAFE- Diploma in Aids & Family Education
 Bachelor's degree programmes (three year duration)
BDP – Bachelor's Degree Programme (leading to B.A., B.Com. and B.Sc. Degree respectively)
BTS – Bachelor in Tourism Studies.

P.G. diploma programmes (one year duration)
PGDRD- Post Graduate Diploma in Rural Development.
PGDHE- Post Graduate Diploma in Higher Education.
PGDE and SD- Post Graduate Diploma in Environment and Sustainable Development.
PGDDE- Post Graduate Diploma in Distance Education
PGDT- Post Graduate Diploma in Translation.
PGDDM – Post Graduate Diploma in Disaster Management

Master's degree programmes

MEG, M.A.R.D., M.P.S., M.S.O., M.E.C., M.P.A., M.A.H., M.H.D., M.Com., M.Ed., M.Phil. and M.COM.

A graduate in any discipline is eligible for admission. Admission is open to any student of any institution and also any employed educated person. Student's handbook and prospectus containing the application form etc. can be obtained from the co-ordinator of IGNOU study centre.

 Study Centre of Institute of Distance Learning (IDOL) under Gauhati University
It offers admission to the P.G. Courses in the subjects of English, Assamese, Economics, Political Science, History, Bengali, Bodo, Philosophy, Mathematics and Commerce. Besides it offers Masters in communication and journalism (MCJ/PGDJMC), PG Diploma in Sales and Marketing Management (PGDSMM), PG Diploma in Business Management (PGDBM), PG Diploma in Finance Management (PGDFM), PG Diploma in Insurance and Risk Management PGDIM), PG Diploma in Banking and Finance Services (PGDBFS) and PG Diploma in Computer Application (PGDCA). Prospectus for these courses can be obtained from its co-ordinator, Sri Monoj Kr. Das ( Associate Prof.), Department of Political Science, Bajali College)

Facilities 
 Classrooms
 Library
 Laboratories
 Internet facility
 Computer laboratory
 Seminars and workshops
 Seminar Halls & Auditorium
 Playground
 Hostels
 Canteen

Intake capacity 
 B.A  (first year - 500, second year- 500, third year- 500)
 B.Sc. (first year - 200, second year- 200, third year- 200) 
 M.A in Assamese and geography
 M.Sc. in zoology (18 seats) and mathematics

References 

Colleges affiliated to Gauhati University
Bajali district
Educational institutions established in 1955
1955 establishments in Assam